The Princess of Wales Memorial Match was a 50-over exhibition cricket match played at Lord's, London, on 18 July 1998, and contested by the Marylebone Cricket Club (MCC), whose home ground is Lord's, and a Rest of the World XI. The Rest of the World team won the match by six wickets after chasing down the MCC's total of 261 runs with 6.3 overs to spare. The match raised more than £1 million for the Princess of Wales Memorial Fund, which was set up in memory of Diana, Princess of Wales, who died in a car accident in Paris the previous August.

Squads

Match details

References

Cricket matches
Diana, Princess of Wales